Braian Óscar Ojeda Rodríguez (pronounced “Bry-ahn”, born 27 June 2000) is a Paraguayan professional footballer who plays as a central midfielder for Real Salt Lake on loan from Nottingham Forest.

Club career
Ojeda began his career with Paraguayan Primera División team Olimpia. He was promoted into senior football at the end of the 2018 campaign, appearing for his professional debut on 2 December in a 3–2 victory over Sol de América; he was substituted off at half-time. Another appearances followed a week later against 3 de Febrero, as Olimpia received their forty-second league title. He also participated in three Copa Paraguay games that year. In March 2019, Ojeda renewed his contract. In July, after not featuring in 2019, Ojeda was loaned out to Defensa y Justicia of the Argentine Primera División.

On 31 August 2021, Ojeda moved to EFL Championship side Nottingham Forest on a four-year deal for an undisclosed fee. He made his debut in a 0-0 draw against Luton Town on 23 November 2021.

On 4 August 2022, Ojeda was loaned to Major League Soccer side Real Salt Lake for the 2022–23 season.

International career
Ojeda represented Paraguay at U17 and U20 level. He appeared eight times at the 2017 South American U-17 Championship in Chile, as they qualified for the 2017 FIFA U-17 World Cup in India; where he featured against Mali, New Zealand and the United States. In 2019, Ojeda played three times at the South American U-20 Championship.

In 2020, Ojeda held representative honours with the Paraguay national under-23 squad at the 2020 CONMEBOL Pre-Olympic Tournament.

He made his debut for the senior squad on 2 September 2021 in a World Cup qualifier against Ecuador, a 0–2 away loss. He substituted Hugo Martínez in the 65th minute.

Career statistics
.

Honours
Olimpia
Paraguayan Primera División: 2018 Clausura
Nottingham Forest
EFL Championship play-offs: 2022

References

External links

2000 births
Living people
People from Itauguá
Paraguayan footballers
Paraguay under-20 international footballers
Paraguay international footballers
Association football midfielders
Paraguayan expatriate footballers
Expatriate footballers in Argentina
Paraguayan expatriate sportspeople in Argentina
Paraguayan Primera División players
Argentine Primera División players
Club Olimpia footballers
Defensa y Justicia footballers
Nottingham Forest F.C. players
Real Salt Lake players
Expatriate footballers in England
Paraguayan expatriate sportspeople in England
Expatriate soccer players in the United States
Paraguayan expatriate sportspeople in the United States
Major League Soccer players